Gorzyce may refer to the following places in Poland:
Gorzyce, Kościan County in Greater Poland Voivodeship (west-central Poland)
Gorzyce, Września County in Greater Poland Voivodeship (west-central Poland)
Gorzyce, Kuyavian-Pomeranian Voivodeship (north-central Poland)
Gorzyce, Lesser Poland Voivodeship (south Poland)
Gorzyce, Silesian Voivodeship (south Poland)
Gorzyce, Przeworsk County in Subcarpathian Voivodeship (south-east Poland)
Gorzyce, Tarnobrzeg County in Subcarpathian Voivodeship (south-east Poland)
Gorzyce, Jasło County in Subcarpathian Voivodeship (south-east Poland)
Górzyce, Lower Silesian Voivodeship (south-west Poland)